CJK Radicals Supplement is a Unicode block containing alternative, often positional, forms of the Kangxi radicals. They are used as headers in dictionary indices and other CJK ideograph collections organized by radical-stroke.

Block

History
The following Unicode-related documents record the purpose and process of defining specific characters in the CJK Radicals Supplement block:

References 

Unicode blocks